Sultan Muhammad Shah may refer to:

Sultan Muhammad Shah of Brunei (reigned 1368-1402)
Sultan Muhammad Shah of Malacca (1424–1444)
Sultan Muhammad Shah of Selangor (1804–1857)
Sultan Aga Khan III (Muhammed Shah Aga Khan) (1877–1957), 48th Imam of the Nizari Ismaili community